is a Japanese comic science fiction manga series written and illustrated by Yoshihiro Togashi. The plot follows the misadventures of alien Prince Baka Ki El Dogra, who crash-lands on Earth and forcibly begins living with high school student and baseball player Yukitaka Tsutsui. However, Prince Baka gradually realizes that he is targeted by aliens from other planets, and he uses his clever wits to somehow maintain world peace each time. Along with its short length and more realistic art style, the story of Level E focuses much more heavily on humor than Togashi's more famous shōnen series Yu Yu Hakusho and Hunter × Hunter.

Level E was originally serialized in the Japanese Shueisha magazine Weekly Shōnen Jump from 1995 to 1997 for a total of 16 chapters. These chapters have since been collected into three volumes, as well as two magazine-style books. An anime adaptation of Level E directed by Toshiyuki Katō was produced by Pierrot and David Production and aired on TV Tokyo in early 2011.

Plot
Earth has been populated by thousands of aliens from all over the galaxy. While all the other aliens are aware of their presence, it is a secret only from the Earthlings. Baka, the prince of the planet Dogra, crash lands on Earth and loses his memory. He forcibly moves in with Yukitaka Tsutsui, a first year high school student who had just moved out on his own. The normal life he once knew is quickly pulled away as he becomes the target of the prince's torment.

Characters

The effeminate-looking first prince of the planet Dogura. He has an exceptionally high IQ and has little interest other than using it to torment those around him for his own amusement.

High school student and the Prince's roommate. Plays baseball. A former punk.

 
Yukitaka's next door neighbor and school mate. Miho's father is a researcher studying alien life on Earth. Has been taught to notice hidden cameras, tracking devices and secret guards.

Captain of the Royal Guard Army. He is in his tenth year. His top priority is that of the Prince Baka's bodyguard. Fifth year guard, Sado, and first year guard, Colin, work under him.

Production
Level E was written and illustrated by Yoshihiro Togashi, who had established himself as a prominent manga artist with his popular action series YuYu Hakusho. When the decision was made to serialize Level E, Togashi had only created the first chapter. Because the story involved the protagonist as an alien changing each chapter, he titled the manga "Alien Crises". He quickly changed it to its final name after being told the former title was too explicit. After renting a videotape called "Level 4", he affirmed to himself that he should name the series using the first English language letter of the word "alien". He was informed that the first letter was "A" and not "E", but he replied that he always associated the term with E.T.. Togashi has stated that he is a fan of the horror genre of films and has cited visual effects designer H. R. Giger (of the Alien franchise) as a major influence. Togashi based the setting of Level E on his own hometown of Yamagata with close attention to detail. For the humor, Togashi took inspiration from the gag manga Gaki Deka.

Media

Manga
Written and illustrated by Yoshihiro Togashi, Level E was serialized in Shueisha's shōnen manga magazine Weekly Shōnen Jump from October 2, 1995, to January 15, 1997. A total of sixteen chapters were collected into three volumes (tankōbon) altogether. The first was released on March 4, 1996, the second on October 3, 1996, and the third on May 1, 1997. In addition, Level E was re-released as part of the Shueisha Jump Remix series of magazine-style books, with two volumes being released in 2009. It was also re-published by Shueisha into two bunkoban volumes released on September 17, and October 15, 2010. Level E has been translated into Chinese, serialized in the magazine Formosa Youth, and released in volume format by Tong Li Publishing in the Republic of China (Taiwan). It was also published in Brazil by Editora JBC, in France by Kazé, and Spain by Planeta DeAgostini Comics.

Anime
A 13-episode anime adaptation of Level E was produced by TV Tokyo, Pierrot and David Production and directed by Toshiyuki Katō, with Jukki Hanada handling series scripts, Itsuko Takeda designing the characters and Yang Bang-ean composing the music. The series originally aired on Japan's TV Tokyo from January 11, 2011 to April 5, 2011. The show's opening theme, is performed by Chiaki Kuriyama, and its ending theme, is performed by ViViD. Crunchyroll has simulcast the series on their streaming website in other parts of the world one hour after each initial TV Tokyo airing. As stated by Kun Geo, the website's CEO, “TV Tokyo's streaming of Level E shows their commitment to bringing anime to a global audience. We are honored to be able to present this title from one of the greatest manga creators of all-time, and to be able to say that Crunchyroll's streaming of this title will directly contribute to the financial viability of all parties involved in the production, from broadcaster to animator to creator.” Funimation has announced that they have licensed the TV series at Katsucon 2012.

The anime sets the story in the modern era, with flat-screen TVs and smartphones, which were not available when the original manga was released, appearing in the story. All chapters except for the final chapter of the manga, "Honeymoon...!", have been adapted. The narration was done by Fumihiko Tachiki.

Merchandise
Several pieces of merchandise that tie into the anime have been released. These include CD singles for the opening and closing themes, apparel, and towels. Aniplex released Level E on DVD in Japan beginning on February 23, 2011, concluding with the sixth volume on July 27, 2011. It included as between two and three episodes apiece, as well as extra features.

Reception
Carl Kimlinger of the Anime News Network gave an average grade to the first six episodes of the series, though he found that the artwork, animation, and music were good, and that its writing was "undeniably clever, even audacious". However, the reviewer felt the series to be less and less endearing to watch, particularly after the first three episodes, the absence of character Yukitaka Tsutsui, and the use of mini-story arcs. "There's a quixotic dignity in its use of entire story-arcs to set up single gags and a laudable courage in its willingness to experiment (check out the aged atmosphere created by episode four's thick lines and faded colors)," Kimlinger summarized. "That doesn't make it fun to watch, however. In fact, each successive episode leaves one feeling emptier and less charitable towards Prince than the last." Erin Finnegan of the same website made similar comments regarding the narrative progression of Level E. Finnegan stated, "Maybe it's just me. I can't get attached to characters who are only going to be around for a few episodes unless they make an incredible impression, otherwise it's very hard to write loveable characters that will only last for three or four episodes. [...] In Level E, it's hard to get attached to the Prince, who doesn't appear at all in some episodes, and in other episodes he gets very little screen time. Plus he's such a jerk, it's hard to like him or care about his shenanigans."

References

External links
 
 
 

1995 manga
2011 Japanese television series debuts
2011 Japanese television series endings
Alien invasions in comics
Aniplex
Comedy anime and manga
David Production
Extraterrestrials in anime and manga
Funimation
Pierrot (company)
Science fiction anime and manga
Shōnen manga
Shueisha manga
Shueisha franchises
TV Tokyo original programming
Yoshihiro Togashi